"Two-Lane Blacktop" is a song by Rob Zombie from his Past, Present & Future compilation album. The song is loosely based on the 1971 road movie Two-Lane Blacktop directed by Monte Hellman. The song was also featured in the racing game Need for Speed: Underground in 2003 and then again in the film Venom in 2005.

Track listing

Personnel
Rob Zombie – vocals, lyricist, producer
Riggs – guitar
Patrick Kennison - rhythm and lead guitar
Blasko – bass
Tempesta – drums
Scott Humphrey – producer, mixing
Chris Baseford – engineering

Charts

References

2003 singles
Rob Zombie songs
Songs written by Rob Zombie
Songs written by Scott Humphrey
2003 songs
Geffen Records singles